This was the first edition of the tournament.

Lukáš Klein won the title after defeating Zizou Bergs 6–2, 6–4 in the final.

Seeds

Draw

Finals

Top half

Bottom half

References

External links
Main draw
Qualifying draw

Saturn Oil Open - 1
Troisdorf Challenger